406 was a year of the Julian calendar. 406 may also refer to:

 406 (number)
 406 MHz, the COMPASS distress frequency
 Area code 406 in Montana, United States
 HTTP 406, an error code
 Any of several highways; see List of highways numbered 406
 Peugeot 406, a French car

See also